The women's 100 metre breaststroke event at the 2014 Commonwealth Games as part of the swimming programme took place on 27 and 28 July at the Tollcross International Swimming Centre in Glasgow, Scotland.

The medals were presented by Michael Fennell, honorary life vice-president of the Commonwealth Games Federation and president of the Jamaica Olympic Association, and the quaichs were presented by Forbes Dunlop, chief executive officer of Scottish Swimming.

Records
Prior to this competition, the existing world and Commonwealth Games records were as follows.

Results

Heats

Semifinals

Final

References

External links

Women's 100 metre breaststroke
Commonwealth Games
2014 in women's swimming